Michael Withers (born 1 February 1938) is an Australian water polo player who competed at three Olympic Games. 

He competed at the 1960 Rome, 1964 Tokyo and 1972 Munich Olympics as a goalkeeper. In 2011, he was inducted into the Water Polo Australia Hall of Fame.

In 1962 he won the 110 yard breaststroke event at the Victorian state swimming championships.

See also
 Australia men's Olympic water polo team records and statistics
 List of men's Olympic water polo tournament goalkeepers

References

External links
 

1938 births
Living people
Australian male water polo players
Water polo goalkeepers
Olympic water polo players of Australia
Water polo players at the 1960 Summer Olympics
Water polo players at the 1964 Summer Olympics
Water polo players at the 1972 Summer Olympics